HD 20781 is a star which is part of a wide binary system with HD 20782. The companion star has a very large angular separation of 252 arcsec, corresponding to 9080 AU at the distance of HD 20782. Both stars possess their own planetary systems in S type orbits, with a total of five known planets around both stars. This is the first known example of planets being found orbiting both components of a wide binary system. HD 20781 has no noticeable starspot activity.

Planetary system 
In 2011, a pair of Neptune-mass gas giants were detected with the radial velocity method. In 2017, these planets were confirmed and an additional two inner super-Earths were detected, with periods of 5.3 and 13.9 days respectively.

See also 
 List of extrasolar planets
 XO-2, a wide binary star in the constellation Lynx

References

External links 
 
 

Fornax (constellation)
K-type main-sequence stars
020781
015526
Planetary systems with four confirmed planets
2
Durchmusterung objects
J03200291-2847016